The Commission to Study the Organization of Peace (CSOP), was an organization established during World War II to promote the formation of a United Nations as successor to the failed League of Nations.

History

In 1939, Professor James T. Shotwell of Columbia University, Professor Clyde Eagleton of New York University, Quincy Wright of the University of Chicago, and League of Nations Association director Clark Eichelberger co-founded the Commission to Study the Organization of Peace. Supporters included U.S. President Franklin Delano Roosevelt, U.S. Secretary of State Cordell Hull, and Undersecretary of State Sumner Welles.

On December 30, 1942 letter to New York State Governor Herbert H. Lehman, executive director Clark Eichelberger described progress to date made by the commission:  a First Report (November 1940) regarding fundamentals of lasting (world) peace, a Second Report (undated) regarding problems in reconstruction after World War II, and a Third Report (due out in 1943) regarding the formation of the United Nations "to carry out the principles of the Atlantic Charter."

In November 1943 (some time after November 5, 1943), the CSOP published a 27-page Fourth Report on the "Fundamentals of the International Organization." In it, the commission stated its determination to form a United Nations organization differently from the method to devise the earlier (unsuccessful) League of Nations. The method followed to form the League of Nation was to "draft a constitution in broad, firm outlines and leave it to the future to fill in the details." The CSOP advocated an alternative method to form a succeeding United Nations, "to begin with the details and work out through them to a completed whole."

Members

In 1942, CSOP members included:

 James T. Shotwell, Chairman
 Margaret Olson, Secretary
 Clark Eichelberger, Executive Director
 Executive Committee:
 William Allan Nielson, Executive Chairman
 Clyde Eagleton, Vice-Chairman
 Members: Malcolm W. Davis, Lucius R. Eastman, Benjamin Gerig, Roger S. Greene, Emily Hickman, Pauline Mandigo, Quincy Wright
 Studies Committee:
 Clyde Eagleton, Chairman
 Members: Malcolm W. Davis, Benjamin Gerig, Harry Gideonse, Carter Goodrich, Willam P. Maddox, Walter Sharp, Quincy Wright

In 1943, members included:  James T. Shotwell (Chairman), Allen D. Albert, Mary Noel Arrowsmith, Henry A. Arkinson, Ruhl J. Bartlett, Clarence A. Berdahl, Arthur E. Bestor, Frank G. Boudreau MD, Phillips Bradley, Esther Caukin Brunauer, James B. Carey, Ben M. Cherrington, John L. Childs, E. J. Coil, Kenneth Colegrove, J. B. Condliffe, Edward A. Conway, Merle Curd, Marion Cuthbert, Mrs. Harvey N. Davis, Malcohn W. Davis, Monroe E. Deutsch, Marshall E. Dimock, Ursula Hubbard Duffus, Clark M. Eichelberger, William Emerson, Philo T. Farnsworth, Edgar J. Fisher, Denna F. Fleming, Margaret E. Forsyth, Harry D. Gideonse, Virginia C. Gildersleeve, Arthur J. Goldsmith, Carter Goodrich, Roger S. Greene, Pennington Haile, J. Eugene Harley, Henry I. Harriman, Walter D. Head, Amy Hewes, Emily Hickman, Melvin D. Hildreth, Edward H. Hume, MD, Erling M. Hunt, Samuel Guy Inman, Oscar I. Janowsky, Alvin Johnson, Anne Hartwell Johnstone, B. H. Kizer, John I. Knudson, Hans Kohn, Walter M. Kotschnig, Walter H. C. Laves, Katherine Lenroot, Beryl H. Levy, Frank Lorimer, Pauline E. Mandigo, Charles E. Martin, F. Dean McClusky, Francis E. McMahon, Frederick C. McKee, William P. Merrill, Hugh Moore, George W. Morgan, Laura Puffer Morgan, S. D. Myres Jr, Philip C. Nash, William Allan Neilson, G. Bernard Noble, Ernest Minor Patterson, James G. Patton, Ralph Barton Perry, James P. Pope, Richard J. Purcell, C. Eden Quainton, Harry B. Reynolds, Leland Rex Robinson, Chester H. Rowell, John A. Ryan, Sanford Schwarz, Hans Simons, Preston Slosson, Eugene Staley, Waldo E. Stephens, Arthur Sweetser, Elbert D. Thomas, Channing H. Tobias, Sarah Wambaugh, Edith E. Ware, Robert J. Watt, W. W. Waymack, Ernest H. Wilkins, C.-E. A. Winslow MD, Richard R. Wood, Quincy Wright, James Fulton Zimmerman

In 1962, executive committee members included: James T. Shotwell (honorary chairman), Arthur N. Holcombe (chairman), Clarence A. Berdahl, Inis L. Claude Jr., Benjamin V. Cohen, Oscar A. de Lima, Clark M. Eichelberger, Leland M. Goodrich, Charles C. Price, James R. Warburg, Richard R. Wood, Quincy Wood.

The committee continued its existence into the 1950s (when its address was 41 East 65th Street, New York City), the 1960s (when its address was 345 East 46th Street, New York City), and as late as 1970 and 1973, when it was still publishing reports

Legacy

Clark Eichelberger and Herbert H. Lehman were both later members of the Committee for the Marshall Plan (1947–1948).

See also

 United Nations
 Committee for the Marshall Plan
 James T. Shotwell
 Clark Eichelberger

References

External sources

 United Nations Television: General Debate (Cont'd) - 30th Meeting, 33rd Regular Session Human Rights Council (September 26, 2016) 
 GuideStar:  Commission to Study the Organization of Peace
 University of Pennsylvania: various publications of CSOP

Organizations based in Manhattan
Non-profit organizations based in New York City
Organizations established in 1939
1939 establishments in New York (state)
1942 establishments in New York (state)